Pāua is the Māori name given to three New Zealand species of large edible sea snails, marine gastropod molluscs which belong to the family Haliotidae (in which there is only one genus, Haliotis), known in the United States and Australia as abalone, and in the United Kingdom as ormer shells. Pāua has entered English through common use in the New Zealand English dialect, and is both singular and plural, following the grammar rules of its original language.

Species 

There are three species of New Zealand pāua: 

New Zealand's best known pāua species is Haliotis iris. It is also the most common species, growing up to 18 cm (7") in width

Habitat
Pāua are commonly found in shallow coastal waters along rocky shorelines in depths of 1 to 10 metres (3' to 30'). There is clear distinction between juvenile and adult habitats for Haliotis iris, pāua less than 7 cm (3") occur in crevices and under stones in the shallow intertidal zone while adults are found in subtidal zone

Life 
These large sea snails survive the strong tidal surges by clinging to rocks using their large muscular foot. They consume seaweed.

Harvesting
Pāua are gathered recreationally and commercially but strict catch limits are set for both. For recreational fishermen this is ten pāua per person per day. The minimum legal size for caught pāua is 125 mm (5") for Haliotis iris and 80 mm (3¼") for Haliotis australis, measured in a straight line at the greatest length of the shell. The exception is Haliotis iris taken from the Amateur Taranaki Paua Fishery Area, which is the area of Taranaki coast bounded by the Awakino River in the north and the Whanganui River in the south, in which the minimum legal size is 85 mm (3¼"). However, pāua caught in this area cannot be taken east of State Highway 4 unless they meet the 125 mm (5") limit.

In addition, no single person may have in their possession at any time (including on land) more than 20 pāua or more than 2.5 kg (5½ lb) of shucked (shell removed) pāua. Pāua can only be caught by free diving; it is illegal to dive for pāua using scuba equipment. All pāua must remain un-shucked until they are on the land side of the high tide mark so Ministry for Primary Industries (MPI) fishery officers can inspect them if required.

There is an extensive global black market in the collection and export of abalone meat. Pāua poaching is a major industry in New Zealand with many thousands being taken illegally, often undersized. The right to harvest pāua can be granted legally under Māori customary rights, but since permits to harvest are abused, it is difficult to police. The limit is strictly enforced by roving MPI fishery officers with the backing of police. Fishery officers can issue infringement notices of between $250 and $500 for minor offences, such as having one or two more pāua than permitted. More serious offences have resulted in hefty court convictions, including seizure of diving gear, boats, and motor vehicles as well as large fines and in rare cases, imprisonment. The Ministry of Fisheries expects in the year 2004/05, nearly 1,000 tons of pāua will be poached, with 75% of that being
undersized.

Human use

Highly polished New Zealand pāua shells are extremely popular as pieces of jewellery with their striking blue, green, and purple iridescence.

Whole shells were commonly used as ashtrays through the 20th century.

Other names
Haliotis means 'sea ear' and some parts of the world use this term for various species. Pāua is also called "Sea Opal" in the United States and Australia.

Pāua aquaculture

Background
Pāua aquaculture is a growing industry in New Zealand. The industry was started in New Zealand in the 1980s and to date there are 14 pāua farms operating which are located throughout New Zealand, from Whangarei to Stewart Island. The first farms that were started consisted of small scale back yard and shed farms in which techniques and processes that grew good quality pāua were developed and these are now being used on a commercial scale in the large pāua farms. These farms produce pāua for their meat, shells and some farms solely focus on the production of blue pearls. Most of the production from these farms is exported to the US, and Asian markets.

There is high demand on the worldwide market as decline in wild stocks due to over-fishing and poaching means that the global market for abalone is greatly under supplied.

Aquacultural uses

Pāua meat and shells
Most pāua farms on-grow pāua that is produced from wild broodstock, however some farms have developed their own hatcheries and selective breeding programs to produce faster growing species, the pāua are then grown to market size (depending on conditions this usually takes 2 – 3 years) in either long trays with inflow of seawater at one end and out flow at the other, or smaller tanks with tipper buckets that regularly dump seawater into the tanks to recreate wave motion that the pāua experience in the wild.

There are a number of different feeds used throughout the pāua's life-cycle. Pāua hatch as trochophore larvae and feed on plankton that are present in seawater that is being pumped into the holding tanks, when the larvae are ready to settle (usually 7 days at 16 °C; 61°F) they are moved to settlement tanks which consist of many glass plates that have small films of diatoms present (usually Navicula minimata). The diatoms are the main food source for the juveniles until they reach about 3 cm (1") in length then the diet is switched to a macroalgae species. Several species have been used including Lessonia variegata Pterocladia sp. and Ulva lactuca, however research has shown that pāua will eat most seaweed species. The pāua are considered adults around 6 cm (2") in size and are then fed on a meal based diet until they are ready for processing and sale.

Pāua pearls 

To produce pāua pearls the pāua are harvested from the wild stocks (at the legal size of 12.5 cm; 5"), shell or plastic based implants are either poked through the shell or fixed in place under the shell with glue, the shape of the insert dictates the shape of the final pearl. After the pāua are “nucleated” they are kept in tanks for 2 to 3 years and fed on either seaweed or meal during which time they coat the insert with nacre . After the 2 – 3 years they are harvested from the tanks, the meat is shucked, and the pearl is then removed. 
The quality and size of the pearl changes depending on the size of the pāua. The pearls tend to be smaller when hatchery-reared pāua are used, which is why pāua from the wild are preferred. High stress levels within the farm can prevent the pāua from coating the insert to produce the pearl so control of the conditions in the farm to ensure that the pāua are not stressed is paramount in pearl production.

Popular culture
Pāua shells make up the decoration on Xena's first chakram in the hit TV series Xena: Warrior Princess. Although the show was set predominately in Ancient Greece, the shell is used because the pāua is native to New Zealand, where the show was filmed.

Notes

References
 Powell A W B, New Zealand Mollusca, William Collins Publishers Ltd, Auckland, New Zealand 1979 
 Kirk O. Hahn, Handbook of culture of abalone and other marine gastropods, CRC Press Inc, Boca Raton, Florida 1989

Further reading
 McCrea, Malcolm (2005) Paua Craft: A Nga Paua.| url = http://www.pauamana.com Raupo Publishing (NZ). .

Haliotidae
Gastropods of New Zealand
Mollusc common names
New Zealand seafood
Māori cuisine